The Anti-Defamation League (ADL), formerly known as the Anti-Defamation League of B'nai B'rith, is a Jewish international non-governmental organization based in the United States specializing in civil rights law. It was founded in late September 1913 by the Independent Order of B'nai B'rith, a Jewish service organization, in the wake of the contentious murder conviction of Leo Frank. ADL subsequently split from B'nai B'rith and continued as an independent US section 501(c)(3) nonprofit.

Jonathan Greenblatt, a former Silicon Valley tech executive and former Obama administration official, succeeded Abraham Foxman as national director in July 2015. Foxman had served in the role since 1987.

ADL headquarters are located in Murray Hill, in the New York City borough of Manhattan. The ADL has 25 regional offices in the United States including a Government Relations Office in Washington, DC, as well as an office in Israel and staff in Europe. In its 2019 annual information Form 990, ADL reported total revenues of $92 million, the vast majority from contributions and grants. Its total operating revenue is reported at $80.9 million.

History 

In its early decades, the ADL benefited from being among the few highly centralized Jewish community relations organizations alongside the American Jewish Committee and American Jewish Congress. This characteristic gave these three organizations greater influence on the national Jewish community at a time when most local congregations and organizations were splintered, with little outreach to the broader community. By the 1970s, decentralization yielded greater influence. By this point the ADL had succeeded in developing local branches, though the central office remained significant even in terms of local branch activities.

Origins 
The ADL was founded in late September 1913 by B'nai B'rith, with Sigmund Livingston as its first leader. Its charter states, 
The ADL was founded by B'nai B'rith as a response to attacks on Jews. The murder conviction of Atlanta B'nai B'rith President Leo Frank, for the death of a 13-year-old factory worker, was seen by Jewish leaders as having been wrongly prosecuted and decided because of local antisemitism and agitation by some of the local press. The role that antisemitism played in regards to Frank's conviction was mentioned by Adolf Kraus when he announced the creation of the ADL. According to historians, ADL's early strategy would be to pressure newspapers, theaters, and other businesses seen as defaming or discriminating against Jews; proposed methods included boycotts and pressuring advertisers, and it also considered demanding prior reviews of theater productions for antisemitism. After Georgia's outgoing governor commuted Frank's death sentence to life imprisonment in 1915, a lynch mob abducted Frank from prison and killed him. Today historians generally say that Frank did not commit the 1913 murder; Frank was granted a posthumous pardon from Georgia in 1986 after ADL requests.

One of the ADL's early campaigns occurred in the 1920s when it organized a media effort and consumer boycott against The Dearborn Independent, a publication published by American automobile industrialist Henry Ford. The publication contained virulently antisemitic articles and commented heavily on The Protocols of the Elders of Zion, an antisemitic hoax. The ADL and allied organizations pressured Ford until he issued an apology in 1927.

In 1933 the ADL moved offices to Chicago and Richard E. Gutstadt became director of national activities. With the change in leadership, the ADL shifted from Livingston's reactive responses to antisemitic action to a much more aggressive policy.

During the 1930s, ADL, along with the American Jewish Committee, coordinated American Jewish groups across the country in monitoring the activities of the German-American Bund and its pro-Nazi, nativist allies in the United States. In many instances, these community-based defense organizations paid informants to infiltrate these groups and report on what they discovered. The longest-lived and most effective of these American Jewish resistance organizations was the Los Angeles Jewish Community Committee (LAJCC), which was backed financially by the Jewish leaders of the motion picture industry. The day-to-day operations of the LAJCC were supervised by a Jewish attorney, Leon L. Lewis. Lewis was uniquely qualified to combat the rise of Nazism in Los Angeles, having served as the first national secretary of the Anti-Defamation League in Chicago from 1925 to 1931. From 1934 to 1941, the LAJCC maintained its undercover surveillance of the German-American Bund, the Silver Shirts and dozens of other pro-Nazi, nativist groups that operated in Los Angeles. Partnering with the American Legion in Los Angeles, the LAJCC channeled eyewitness accounts of sedition on to federal authorities. Working with the ADL, Leon Lewis and the LAJCC played a strategic role in counseling the McCormack-Dickstein Committee investigation of Nazi propaganda activities in the United States (1934) and the Dies Committee investigation of "un-American activities" (1938–1940). In their final reports to Congress, both committees found that the sudden rise in political antisemitism in the United States during the decade was due, in part, to the German government's support of these domestic groups.

Paralleling its infiltration efforts, the ADL continued its attempts to reduce antisemitic caricatures in the media. Much like the NAACP, it chose a non-confrontational approach, attempting to build long-lasting relationships and avoid backlash. The ADL requested its members avoid public confrontation, instead directing them to send letters to the media and advertising companies that included antisemitic or racist references in screening copies of their books and movies. This strategy kept the campaigns out of the public eye and instead emphasized the development of a relationship with companies.

1970s 
In 1973, Nathan Perlmutter took the role of national director, serving until his death in 1987. Under the tenure of Perlmutter and his 1978–1983 co-director of interreligious affairs Yechiel Eckstein, the ADL shifted its approach to the evangelical Christian movement. Through the 60s and early 70s, the ADL had conflicted with the American Jewish Congress over their collaborations with evangelicals. Perlmutter and Eckstein changed this orientation, increasing collaborations and developing long-lasting lines of communication between the ADL and evangelical groups. This collaboration continued under the Foxman administration.

Since the 1970s, the ADL has partnered with the Federal Bureau of Investigation (FBI) field offices, sharing information learned from the monitoring of extremist groups.

In 1977 the ADL opened a headquarters in Jerusalem.

1980s

1990s 
The ADL released a 1991 report observing an increase in the use of public access television stations by extremist groups. The report came in the wake of the trial of Tom Metzger, a white supremacist leader found guilty of inciting a murder via his public access TV station.

In 1994, ADL became embroiled in a dispute between neighbors in Denver, Colorado. One neighbor recorded private telephone conversations of the other on advice of the ADL after reporting antisemitic remarks to the ADL made by these neighbors heard via a police scanner. Neither the Aronsons nor ADL were aware that Congress had amended federal wiretap law which made it illegal to record conversations from a cordless telephone, to transcribe the material, and to use the transcriptions for any purpose. These recordings were used as basis for a federal civil lawsuit against the family, and ADL Regional Director Saul Rosenthal described the remarks as part of a "vicious antisemitic campaign". This led to the family being ridiculed and excluded in their community and to career damage. All charges against the couple were dropped in 2000 due to changes in federal wiretapping law making recording of cordless phone conversations illegal, a fact about which the ADL and the attorneys in the case were unaware. The jury awarded the couple $10 million in damages.

This was the first-ever verdict against the ADL. Only once before had the League been subject to a defamation trial, a case it won in 1984. Other cases were dismissed before reaching trial. The ADL appealed the case to a superior court, which upheld the verdict, and the Supreme Court ultimately declined to take the case. The ADL paid the original $10 million plus interest in 2004.

In 1996, ADL settled a federal civil lawsuit filed by groups representing African Americans and Arab Americans that alleged that the ADL hired agents with police ties to gather information. ADL did not admit any wrongdoing but agreed to a restraining injunction barring ADL from obtaining information from state employees forbidden by law to divulge such information. ADL agreed to contribute $25,000 to a fund that funds inter-community relationship projects, and cover the plaintiffs' legal costs of $175,000.

2000s 
In 2003, the ADL opposed an advertising campaign by People for the Ethical Treatment of Animals (PETA) called "Holocaust on Your Plate" that compared animals killed in the meat industry to victims of the Holocaust. In 2005, PETA apologized for causing distress to the Jewish community through the campaign, though in 2008, the Chief Rabbinate announced that it was planning to gradually phase out the use of the "shackle and hoist" method of kosher slaughter in Israel and South America, in part in response to pressure from PETA.

As of 2007, the ADL said it was archiving MySpace pages associated with white supremacists as part of its effort to track extremism.

The ADL opposed 2008 California Proposition 8, a ballot successful initiative that banned same-sex marriage. It did so alongside Jewish organizations, including the National Council of Jewish Women and the Progressive Jewish Alliance. The ADL filed amicus briefs urging the Supreme Court of California, Ninth Circuit, and the Supreme Court to invalidate Prop 8. In 2015, the ADL opposed the State Religious Freedom Restoration Acts, state laws that used the United States Supreme Court decision in Burwell v. Hobby Lobby Stores, Inc. recognizing a for-profit corporation's claim of religious belief. The ADL opposed these laws out of concern they largely targeted LGBT people or denied access to contraceptives to employees of religiously owned businesses.

2010s 
In November 2014, the organization announced that Jonathan Greenblatt, a former Silicon Valley tech executive and former Obama administration official who had not operated within the Jewish communal organization world prior to his hiring, would succeed Abraham Foxman as national director in July 2015. Foxman had served as national director since 1987. The ADL board of directors renewed Greenblatt's contract as CEO and national director in fall 2020 for a second five-year term. The national chair of the governing board of directors is Esta Gordon Epstein; elected in late 2018 for a three-year term, she is the second woman to hold the organization's top volunteer leadership post.

ADL repeatedly accused Donald Trump, when he was a presidential candidate in 2016, of making use of antisemitic tropes or otherwise exploiting divisive and bigoted rhetoric during the 2016 presidential election campaign. The organization continued to call out President Trump for comments and actions that appeared to give voice or support to extremists such as white supremacists, for politicizing charges of antisemitism for partisan purposes and for continued use of antisemitic tropes.

In mid-2018, ADL raised concerns over President Donald Trump's nomination of then-DC Circuit Court of Appeals judge Brett Kavanaugh as an Associate Justice of the United States Supreme Court. Although ADL had for many years submitted questions to the Senate Judiciary Committee for Supreme Court and other key government nominations, the organization and CEO Jonathan Greenblatt were harshly criticized by many on the right for raising concerns in this instance, particularly with regard to abortion. Subsequently, in another move that enraged many on the right, ADL called for the resignation or firing of Trump administration official Stephen Miller, the architect of the administration's immigration policy, on the basis of his association with white supremacists.

The ADL says it has participated in YouTube's Trusted Flagger program and has encouraged YouTube to remove videos that they flag as hate speech, citing the need to "fight against terrorist use of online resources and cyberhate." The ADL's Center on Technology and Society launched a survey in 2019 exploring online harassment in video games. It found that the majority of surveyed players experienced severe harassment of some kind, and the ADL recommended increased content moderation from game companies and governments. On the other hand, the survey found that over half of players experienced some form of positive community in video games. A separate, earlier survey of the general population found that around a third of people have experienced some form of online harassment.

In July 2017, ADL announced that they would be developing profiles on 36 alt-right and alt-lite leaders.  In 2019 and 2020 ADL executives and staff testified multiple times in front of Congressional committees concerning the dangers of right-wing domestic extremists, noting that the large majority of extremist murders in the United States over the past decade had been committed by white supremacists.

2020s 

In 2020, ADL joined with the NAACP, Color of Change, LULAC, Free Press, the National Hispanic Media Coalition and other organizations in the Stop Hate For Profit campaign. The campaign targeted online hate on Facebook, with over 1000 businesses pausing their ad buys on Facebook for a month.  Subsequently, in September 2020, the campaign organized high-profile athletes, actors and musicians, including Sacha Baron Cohen, Kate Hudson, Kim Kardashian, Viola Davis, Octavia Spencer, James Corden, Jamie Foxx, Katy Perry, Naomi Campbell, Chris Paul, and many others to post Stop Hate for Profit messages targeting Facebook on their social media and to freeze all posts on Instagram for a day.

In 2020, the ADL trained staff to edit Wikipedia pages, but after the project caused Wikipedia editors to discuss this behavior as a possible conflict of interest, the ADL said it suspended the project in April 2021. The ADL is considered a reliable source on Wikipedia, and the ADL said its staff complied with Wikipedia policies by disclosing their affiliations, but some Wikipedia editors objected that the project cited ADL sources disproportionately and did not reflect the volunteer spirit of the website, especially in heavily editing its own Wikipedia article.

In early January 2021, the ADL called for the removal of Donald Trump as president in response to the storming of the United States Capitol and described the relationship of the storming of the Capitol to the far-right and antisemitic groups.

In April 2021, Jonathan Greenblatt released a letter calling on the right-wing American network Fox News to drop commentator Tucker Carlson from its lineup, saying that Carlson had espoused the white genocide conspiracy theory on his show. This call appeared shortly after research indicating that many who participated in the 2021 storming of the United States Capitol had been influenced by this conspiracy theory. The ADL again called for Carlson to be fired in September 2021 following Carlson expressing support for the great replacement theory. Carlson responded, saying "Fuck them" regarding the ADL, describing the ADL's call as politically motivated and defending his statements.

In November 2022, ADL acquired JLens, a pro-Israel advocacy group started in 2012 which campaigns against incentives for  economic disengagement with Israel in environmental, social, and corporate governance (ESG) investing guidelines. Jlens publishes company rankings based on participation in boycotts of Israel and publishes guidelines on investing used by around 30 Jewish companies with portfolios totaling around $200 million. JLens launched a campaign criticizing Morningstar, Inc.), a campaign the ADL collaborated on prior to the 2020 acquisition. The ADL said it would contribute funding to Jlens.

Political positions

Israeli–Palestinian conflict
The ADL says it supports Israel as a Jewish and democratic state. The organization says it supports a two-state solution to the Israeli–Palestinian conflict, arguing that in a one-state solution, "demographic realities would lead to the effective end of a Jewish State of Israel." 

The organization opposed the 1975 United Nations resolution (revoked in 1991) which stated in the resolution that "Zionism is a form of racism and racial discrimination", and attempts to revive that formulation at the 2001 U.N. World Conference Against Racism in Durban, South Africa. In a 2022 speech, Greenblatt stated that "anti-Zionism is antisemitism"; The Times of Israel noted that the "speech marked a rare moment of the organization unequivocally stating that anti-Zionism is an expression of antisemitism."

Israel boycotts and the BDS movement 
While ADL was a lead supporter of Congressional legislation prohibiting US individuals and businesses from joining "unsanctioned boycotts" such as the 1970s Arab League Boycott against Israel, it has taken a different, case-by-case approach to state anti-BDS laws more recently enacted in response to the BDS movement. Several of these laws, which seek to prohibit state agencies and instrumentalities from investing in companies that boycott Israel and from entering into contracts with entities that boycott Israel, have been successfully challenged in the courts. The legal challenges have primarily been brought by the ACLU and CAIR on First Amendment constitutional grounds. ADL generally has not publicly supported laws it felt were constitutionally suspect under the First Amendment, both for legal reasons and because the organization believed that such laws, even if what ADL describes as "well-intentioned", were not an effective means of combating the BDS movement. However, as a general matter the organization also has not publicly opposed such state laws, preferring to work behind the scenes to try to make such laws less infirm under the Constitution or to propose non-binding resolutions opposing BDS. A possible division of internal views in ADL was disclosed when the liberal Jewish publication, The Forward, published ostensible leaked internal ADL staff memos dating from 2016 that opposed the anti-boycott laws. ADL did not comment directly on the leaked memos, but the statement it issued in response appeared to acknowledge both that there were sharply divided views within the organization and that the organization did not try to suppress internal robust discussion.

In 2010, ADL published a list of the "ten leading organizations responsible for maligning Israel in the US," which has included ANSWER, the International Solidarity Movement, and Jewish Voice for Peace for its call for BDS. The ADL published a similar list in 2013.

Alongside similar statements from StandWithUs and American Jewish Committee representatives, the ADL's Greenblatt condemned the United Nations Human Rights Council's (UNHRC) list of companies doing business with Jewish settlements in Israeli-run territories (West Bank, East Jerusalem, Golan Heights), issued in February 2020, calling it a "blacklist."

Circumcision 
ADL has opposed efforts in the US and in Europe to ban circumcision of minors on the grounds of parental and religious freedom, citing the importance of circumcision in Judaism and Islam. ADL has also criticized specific instances of anti-circumcision imagery, such as an anti-circumcision cartoon in the Norwegian newspaper Dagbladet and the comic book Foreskin Man. Regarding the latter, Associate Regional Director Nancy Appel stated that while good people could disagree on the issue of circumcision, it was unacceptable to use antisemitic imagery within the debate. ADL also criticized an anti-circumcision resolution by the Parliamentary Assembly of the Council of Europe, describing it as "leading Europe in a horrific direction toward the forced exclusion of Jewish citizens." In 2018, ADL's Jonathan Greenblatt sent Iceland's Parliament a letter regarding a proposed infant circumcision ban in that country, arguing that the ban should be rejected due to circumcision's religious significance and health benefits. Greenblatt also said that if the ban passed, ADL would report on any celebration by antisemites and other extremists, asserting that this would deter tourism and harm Iceland's economy. The Reykjavík Grapevine described this letter as a threat.

Federal and state legislation 
ADL was among the lead organizations campaigning for thirteen years, ultimately successfully, for the Matthew Shepard and James Byrd Jr. Hate Crimes Prevention Act.  The hold-up in passing that law focused on the inclusion of the term "sexual orientation" as one of the bases that a crime could be deemed a hate crime. ADL also drafted the model hate crimes legislation in the 1980s; it serves as a model for the legislation that a majority of states have adopted.

In 2010, during a hearing for Florida House Bill 11 (Crimes Against Homeless Persons), which was to revise the list of offenses judged to be hate crimes in Florida by adding a person's homeless status, the League lobbied against the bill, which subsequently passed in the House by a vote of 80 to 28 and was sent to the Senate, taking the position that adding more categories to the list would dilute the effectiveness of the law, which already includes race, religion, sexual orientation, disability, and age.

The ADL has strongly supported the Anti-Semitism Awareness Act, a controversial piece of legislation introduced to the US Congress in 2016.

ADL expressed concern over Israeli legislative proposals requiring that NGOs publicize if they receive funding primarily from non-Israeli governments, a bill mostly opposed by centrist and left-wing and supported by right-wing Jewish American groups.

Other 
In October 2010, the ADL condemned remarks by Ovadia Yosef that the sole purpose of non-Jews was to serve the Jews.

ADL supports Comprehensive and DREAM Act legislation that would provide conditional permanent residency to certain undocumented immigrants of good moral character who graduate from US high schools, arrived in the United States as minors, and lived in the country continuously for at least five years prior to the bill's enactment.

The ADL supported some moves of the Trump administration and criticized others. The organization welcomed President Trump moving the US Embassy to Jerusalem. ADL CEO and National Director Jonathan Greenblatt traveled to Israel to join Trump administration officials at the official opening ceremony of the embassy in Jerusalem. The ADL repeatedly criticized Trump for what they viewed as antisemitic tropes and engagement in apologetics for white supremacists. Alongside at least eight other Jewish advocacy organizations, dozens of civil rights organizations, and more than one hundred members of congress, ADL called on the Trump administration to fire administration executive Stephen Miller, the architect of the Trump administration policies on immigration, condemning Miller as a white supremacist.

In 2022, the ADL criticized the government formed by Benjamin Netanyahu in his sixth term, which included representatives from the far-right Otzma Yehudit and Religious Zionist Party, and their leaders, Itamar Ben-Gvir and Bezalel Smotrich. The ADL said that including these parties and lawmakers "would run counter to Israel's founding principles, and impact its standing, even among its strongest supporters."

Relations with religious and ethnic groups

Relations with African-Americans 
In 2004, ADL became the lead partner in the Peace and Diversity Academy, a new New York City public high school with predominantly black and Hispanic students. The school was part of a Bloomberg-led effort to open many smaller schools. In 2014, the school was designated among New York's schools with the lowest graduation rates. In celebration of Black History Month, the ADL created and distributed lesson plans to middle and high school teachers about Shirley Chisholm (1924–2005), the first black woman elected to the US Congress, and an important civil rights leader.

In 1984, The Boston Globe reported that then-ADL national director Nathan Perlmutter said that Rev. Jesse Jackson, Sr. was antisemitic after Jackson referred to New York City as "Hymietown". In 2018 the ADL criticized Rep. Danny Davis for not condemning Louis Farrakhan. Davis subsequently condemned Farrakhan's views, saying, "So let me be clear: I reject, condemn and oppose Minister Farrakhan's views and remarks regarding the Jewish people and the Jewish religion."

The ADL criticized film director Spike Lee regarding his portrayal of Jewish nightclub owners Moe and Josh Flatbush in his film Mo' Better Blues (1990). The ADL said the characterizations of the nightclub owners "dredge up an age-old and highly dangerous form of anti-Semitic stereotyping", and that it was "disappointed that Spike Lee – whose success is largely due to his efforts to break down racial stereotypes and prejudice – has employed the same kind of tactics that he supposedly deplores". Lee's portrayal also angered the B'nai B'rith and other such Jewish organizations, causing Lee to address the criticism in an opinion piece for The New York Times, where he stated "...if critics are telling me that to avoid charges of anti-Semitism, all Jewish characters I write have to be model citizens, and not one can be a villain, cheat or a crook, and that no Jewish people have ever exploited black artists in the history of the entertainment industry, that's unrealistic and unfair".

Interfaith camp 
In 1996 ADL's New England Regional Office established a faith-based initiative called "The Interfaith Youth Leadership Program", better known as "Camp If", or Camp Interfaith. Involving teenagers of the Christian, Jewish, and Islamic faiths, the camp brings the teens together for a week at camp where the teens bond and learn about each other's cultures. The camp has emerged as a new attempt to foster good relations between younger members of the Abrahamic faiths.

Reception 
ADL has been criticized both from the right and left of the US political spectrum, including from within the American Jewish community. ADL positions and actions that have generated criticism include alleged domestic spying, its former Armenian genocide denial, (since repudiated and apologized for), and what parts of the American left argue is the ADL's conflation of criticism of the Israeli government with antisemitism. ADL's support for the Trump administration's decision to move the US Embassy from Tel Aviv to Jerusalem in May 2018 drew criticism. Right-wing groups and pundits, including right-wing Jewish groups, have criticized ADL as being too left-wing, labeling it a "Democratic Party auxiliary".

Graduate student and activist Emmaia Gelman, writing in the Boston Review, says the ADL has conducted a "vigorous, and successful campaign, alongside AIPAC, specifically to characterize Arab American political organizing as dual loyalty." Gelman further says the ADL has propagated "anti-black, anti-immigrant, and anti-queer hate" and has promoted islamophobia rather than deal with the issue.

2020 #DropTheADL campaign 
In August 2020, a coalition of progressive organizations launched the #DropTheADL campaign, arguing that "the ADL is not an ally" in social justice work. The campaign consisted of an open letter and a website, which were shared on social media with the hashtag "#DropTheADL". Notable signatories included the Democratic Socialists of America, Movement for Black Lives, Jewish Voice for Peace, Center for Constitutional Rights, and Council on American–Islamic Relations. The open letter stated that the ADL "has a history and ongoing pattern of attacking social justice movements led by communities of color, queer people, immigrants, Muslims, Arabs, and other marginalized groups, while aligning itself with police, right-wing leaders, and perpetrators of state violence." Some liberal groups responded by defending the ADL, with HIAS CEO Mark Hetfield characterizing #DropTheADL as a "smear campaign". The ADL published a statement that the campaign involved "many of the same groups who have been pushing an anti-Israel agenda for years." Around sixty organizations supported the campaign on its initial launch, and an additional hundred groups had joined by February 2021.

Controversies

New antisemitism concept

In 1974, ADL attorney Arnold Forster and national director Benjamin Epstein published the book The New Anti-Semitism. They expressed concern about what they described as new manifestations of antisemitism coming from radical left, radical right, and pro-Arab figures in the US. Forster and Epstein argued that radical left antisemitism took the form of indifference to the fears of the Jewish people, apathy in dealing with anti-Jewish bias, and an inability to understand the importance of Israel to Jewish survival. A subsequent book, The Real Anti-Semitism in America, published in 1982, was written by ADL national leader Nathan Perlmutter and his wife, Ruth Ann Perlmutter.

Reviewing Forster and Epstein's work in 1974 for the neoconservative magazine Commentary, Earl Raab, founding director of the Nathan Perlmutter Institute for Jewish Advocacy at Brandeis University, agreed that a "new anti-Semitism" was indeed emerging in America in the form of opposition to the supposed collective rights of the Jewish people, but Raab criticized Forster and Epstein for conflating it with anti-Israel bias. Allan Brownfeld writes that Forster and Epstein's new definition of antisemitism trivialized the concept by turning it into "a form of political blackmail" and "a weapon with which to silence any criticism of either Israel or US policy in the Middle East," while Edward S. Shapiro, in A Time for Healing: American Jewry Since World War II, has written that, "Forster and Epstein implied that the new antisemitism was the inability of Gentiles to love Jews and Israel enough."

Norman Finkelstein has written that organizations such as the Anti-Defamation League have brought forward charges of new antisemitism at various intervals since the 1970s, "not to fight antisemitism, but rather to exploit the historical suffering of Jews in order to immunize Israel against criticism." The Washington Post reported in 2006 that the ADL had over the years repeatedly accused Finkelstein of being a "Holocaust denier," and that "these charges have proved baseless."

Armenian genocide denial 
In 2007, Abraham Foxman came under criticism for his stance on the Armenian genocide. ADL had previously described it as a "massacre" and an "atrocity", but not as a "genocide". Foxman had earlier opposed calls for the US Government to recognise it as a "genocide". In early August 2007, complaints about the ADL's refusal to acknowledge the Armenian genocide led to Watertown, Massachusetts's, unanimous town council decision to end its participation in ADL's "No Place for Hate" campaign. (Watertown has a significant Armenian population.) In the subsequent months, some human rights commissions in other Massachusetts communities decided to follow Watertown's lead and withdraw from the ADL's No Place for Hate anti-discrimination program.  ADL had earlier received direct pressure from the Turkish Foreign ministry. Also in August 2007, an editorial in The Boston Globe criticized ADL by saying that, "as an organization concerned about human rights, it ought to acknowledge the genocide against the Armenian people during World War I, and criticize Turkish attempts to repress the memory of this historical reality."

On August 17, 2007, ADL fired its regional New England director, Andrew H. Tarsy, for breaking ranks with the main organization and for saying that ADL should recognize the genocide. In an August 21, 2007, news release, ADL changed its position and acknowledged the genocide, but maintained its opposition to congressional resolutions aimed at recognizing it. Foxman wrote, "the consequences of those actions," by the Ottoman Empire against Armenians, "were indeed tantamount to genocide." The Turkish government condemned the league's statement. Tarsy subsequently won his job back, but subsequently submitted his resignation, on December 4, 2007. The 2007 ADL "Statement on the Armenian Genocide" was criticized by activists as failing to be a full, unequivocal acknowledgment of the Armenian genocide because the use of the qualifier "tantamount" was seen as inappropriate, and the use of the word "consequences" was seen as an attempt to circumvent the international legal definition of genocide by avoiding any language that would imply intent, a crucial aspect of the 1948 UN Genocide Convention definition.

Park51 Community Center opposition 
On July 28, 2010, ADL issued a statement in which it expressed opposition to the Park51 Community Center, a proposed Islamic community center and mosque two blocks from the World Trade Center site in New York. ADL stated, "The controversy which has emerged regarding the building of a Community Center at this location is counterproductive to the healing process. Therefore, under these unique circumstances, we believe the City of New York would be better served if an alternative location could be found." ADL denounced what it saw as bigoted attacks on the project. Foxman opined that some of those who oppose the mosque are "bigots," and that the plan's proponents may have every right to build the mosque at that location. Nevertheless, he said that building the mosque at that site would unnecessarily cause more pain for the families of some victims of 9/11.

This opposition to the Community Center led to criticism of the statement from various parties, including one ADL board member, the American Jewish Committee, the Jewish Community Relations Council of New York, Rabbi Irwin Kula, columnists Jeffrey Goldberg and Peter Beinart, the Interfaith Alliance, and the Shalom Center. In an interview with The New York Times Abraham Foxman published a statement in reaction to criticism. In protest of ADL's stance, CNN host Fareed Zakaria returned the Hubert H. Humphrey First Amendment Freedoms Prize ADL awarded him in 2005. ADL chair Robert G. Sugarman responded to a critical New York Times editorial writing, "we have publicly taken on those who criticized the mosque in ways that reflected anti-Muslim bigotry or used the controversy for that purpose" and stating that ADL has combated Islamophobia.
	
On September 5, 2021, the national director and CEO of ADL, Jonathan Greenblatt, apologized for ADL's opposition to the center, stating, "We were wrong, plain and simple".

See also 

 American-Arab Anti-Discrimination Committee
 Conference of Presidents of Major American Jewish Organizations
 Defamation
 Gay & Lesbian Alliance Against Defamation
 Israel lobby in the United States
 Jewish Council for Public Affairs
 Membership discrimination in California social clubs
 Simon Wiesenthal Center
 Pepe the Frog

References

External links
 

 
1913 establishments in the United States
Anti-racist organizations in the United States
Civil liberties advocacy groups in the United States
Jewish anti-racism
Jewish lobbying
Jewish organizations based in the United States
Jewish political organizations
Opposition to antisemitism in the United States
Organizations established in 1913
Political advocacy groups in the United States
501(c)(3) organizations
Zionist organizations
Israel–United States relations